Cyana obscura is a moth of the family Erebidae first described by George Hampson in 1900. It is found in Australia, where it has been recorded from Queensland.

References

Cyana
Moths described in 1900